Høje Bøge Stadium is an association football stadium in Svendborg, Denmark. It is the home stadium of Danish 2nd Division club SfB-Oure FA. It has a capacity of 7,000, but the attendance record is 8,000 which happened in 1975 in a local matchup against Odense Boldklub in the second tier of the Danish football league system.

The stadium is the historic home ground of Svendborg fB (SfB), and since its superstructures: FC Svendborg, founded in 2008 and dissolved in 2017, as well as the merger team of SfB and Oure Fodbold Akademi (Oure FA): SfB Oure FA. The latter started using Høje Bøge as their home ground prior to the 2019–20 Denmark Series season, after moving from the pitches at Hellegårdsvej / Tipsvænget.

History 
The name Høje Bøge literally means "tall beeches" and refers to the beech trees which surround the site of the stadium.

On 9 June 1997, Svendborg fB hosted Aarhus Fremad in a direct match for promotion to the Danish Superliga on Høje Bøge, which ended in disappointment for the home side which lost 1–3 and would miss out on the historic achievement.

Each summer, Høje Bøge hosts the one-day festival Høje Bøge Open Air, which is organised by Svendborg fB.

References

External links
 About Høje Bøge at svendborgidraetscenter.dk
 Høje Bøge Open Air at højebøgeopenair.dk

Football venues in Denmark
Buildings and structures in Svendborg Municipality